Balaramapuram is one of the panchayats that form the city of Trivandrum, the capital of Kerala, India. It is the most urbanized panchayat in the Thiruvananthapuram district.

Balaramapuram is the centre for production of traditional varieties of handloom textiles meant for the contemporary cloth-wearing style of Kerala. Balaramapuram is a major trade centre for clothing, groceries, furniture, electricals, metals etc. Balaramapuram is also known for mutton dishes, chicken dishes, oysters and fish items. Religious harmony plays a great role. St Sebastian's Church festival during the month of January and the Maha Sivarathri festival at Sri Bharadwaja Rishishwara Shiva Kshetram are examples of this harmony. 

Balaramapuram railway station is situated 1 km from NH47 at Balaramapuram. The station code name of Balaramapuram is ‘BRAM’. As part of one of the busiest and most populated Indian states, Kerala, the Balaramapuram railway station is known amongst the top hundred train ticket booking and train travelling stations of the Indian Railway. The total number of trains that pass through the Balaramapuram (BRAM) junction is 50.

Location
Balaramapuram is located on National Highway 66 15 km south of Thiruvananthapuram (Trivandrum), the capital city of Kerala, India and 17 km north of Parassala, the southern boundary of the state. Balaramapuram lies 77 degrees 5 minutes east longitude and 8 degrees 23 minutes North latitude.

History
During the regime of His Highness Maharaja Balaramavarma, from 1799 to 1810, handloom weaving was first introduced at Balaramapuram. The maharaja and his delava (chief minister), Ummini Thampi jointly decided to convert Balaramapuram and its surrounding places into an agro-based industrial belt with various traditional industries by the development of paddy and coconut cultivation, fishing, weaving, and oil extraction. Separate streets with a clustered at identified places, providing a comparatively better infrastructure for development.

The Delava of Maharaja brought seven weaver families (Shaliars) from Tamil Nadu to produce fabrics for the members of the royal family and made them settle at Balaramapuram in a separate location now called "Shaliar Street". Marketplaces were opened at convenient locations to make the marketing of products easier. The present residents of the street are the descendants of these seven families. Among the prominent weaving masters, Mr. Ponnan alias Appu panicker from Thannivila is an acclaimed weaver who taught the business to others of this region.

The place Balaramapuram itself was named after the king who started industries in this region.

Shaliyar community structure
The people of the Shaliyar community speak Tamil and marry within their own community. The community settlement has four main streets on which the weavers are settled in row houses. The four streets are Single Street, Double Street, Vinayagar Street, and the New Street.

The temple of Agasthiar is placed axially along the main streets. The main deities are Lord Siva Agasthiar muni and Lopamudra. Lord Vinayaka, Muruga, Navagrahas, Naga and Krishna are also worshipped here. The current President of Agasthiar swamy Devasthanam is Sri Venkitachalam and Secretary is Sri Laxmanan.

The Double Street has two temples – The Muttaramman Temple and the Vinayagar Temple. There is a Ganapathi temple in the Vinayagar Street. For males above 18, membership in the temple committee is compulsory. The temple and the related functions form the social hub of all the activities related with the community development.

Urban environment
Main entrance is from NH-47 to the 9 m wide Single Street. The entry is not well defined. The Single Street with two-story buildings on either side act as an axis with the Agasthiar temple being the focal point. The Single street, Double street and the New street are the main streets The Agasthiar temple is placed at the point of intersection of these streets. The streets form a major interaction space as the row houses abut the streets with no front yard.

The houses of the Shaliyar weavers reflect their culture, occupation, and religious beliefs. They have rectangular layouts with houses sharing common walls. All the houses have production units attached to them. The houses of the wealthier families have showrooms. The special kind of architectural detailing of the facades, internal courtyards, and the arrangement of rooms to suit the occupation of weaving, make the houses unique in nature.

There is very little open space or car parking facilities within the settlement. The streets are dotted with community wells. Lack of infrastructure like levelled roads, public water supply, street drains and sewerage are some problems faced by the community. In most places the streets are not levelled and are not accessible for vehicles.

Weaving
The weavers use a traditional type of throw-shuttle pit looms for the production of exclusively cotton fabrics with pure zeri. They do not use any type of improved appliances such as Dobby, Jacquard, Jala, etc. for the production of designs for cloth with extra warp and extra weft. Identical appearance of designs, including warp and weft stripes on the face and backside of the fabric is obtained by this technique of weaving.

No change has so far been taken place in the type of loom or technology of weaving in producing such varieties. The variety known as "Pudava and Kavani" (veshti and upper cloth with pure zeri) still remains as a prestigious bridal gift in marriages. The designs with zeri or coloured yarn, using the age-old technique still has unparallel appeal which can attract even the most sophisticated customers.

Five percent of the houses run agencies for hand loom items. These houses act as collecting points of hand loom clothes produced in the colony. Nine percent of houses do not have any home based activity. Twenty-seven percent of houses use traditional means of production, whereas 59% are based on new methods.

Present conditions
Presently, a major portion of the hand loom clothes produced in this area is sold to the Handloom Development Corporation and Hantex. Due to the emergence of power looms in the weaving industry and drop in the prices of related items, the inhabitants of the colony have found it difficult to persevere in the same field of activity as a result of which, the younger generations are pursuing higher education and alternate employment to make ends meet.

Another reason for this sea of change in the aptitude of the inhabitants is the low price per unit put into making these hand loom items; the overheads being much too higher for houses having lesser looms that the ones, mass-producing these items with the help of separate work place close to the residence. All such varieties, which were reserved for exclusive production in the hand loom sector, are now extensively and widely produced in power looms making the hand loom products not competitive in the market.

Nowadays, a new concept in handloom industry introduced in this area is Ayurvastra, a branch of Ayurveda, the ancient 5,000-year-old Indian system of Vedic healthcare. Loosely translated, "Ayur" is Sanskrit for health, and "Vastra" is clothing, Ayurvastra means Healthy Fabrics, Ayurvastra project is initiated and launched by the Directorate of Handloom, Department of Industries and Commerce and the Department of Government Ayurveda College, aimed at creating a niche for the eco-friendly wellness textiles ( Dyeing textiles using ayurvedic herbs and plants without using synthetic chemicals) Ayurvastra is manufactured and exported by a 50-year-old balaramapuram handloom firm Kairali Exports (kairaliexports.com) exports ayurvastra brand fabrics to US (ayurtex.com), Europe (ayurvastra.in)

Until 1990, the varieties of Balaramapuram had excellent market potential and the weavers there were getting reasonable income and could maintain a better standard of living. Nearly 5100 looms were engaged in the production of such fabrics. No attempt was made to exploit the skill of such weavers, who are masters in their trade, to produce any other variety for expanding market demand.

However, recently this seems to be changing and the demand for hand loomed products is high.

See also
 Neyyattinkara
 Neyyattinkara Railway Station
 Amaravila
 Kanjiramkulam
 Thiruvananthapuram
 Municipalities of Kerala
 Upper cloth revolt
 Neyyattinkara Sree Krishna Swami Temple

References

External links
 Balaramapuram Facebook page
 Centre’s Rural Tourism Project Gets Going

Kingdom of Travancore
Villages in Thiruvananthapuram district